Paul Mark James Robinson (born 7 January 1982) is an English former professional footballer who works as a defensive coach for Portsmouth in League One.

Playing career

Millwall
Born in Barnet, London, Robinson began his career as a trainee with Millwall after being released from Watford, turning professional in August 2001. Later that month he joined Fisher Athletic on loan to gain some first team experience. He made his Millwall debut on 9 September 2002, coming on as a second-half substitute for Darren Ward in a 2–1 home win against Preston North End.

In December 2004 Robinson joined Torquay United on loan, playing twelve times before returning to Millwall and establishing himself as a first team regular, eventually gaining club captaincy under Lions' boss Kenny Jackett and establishing himself as a firm fan favourite. In 2009, he struggled with several injury problems, and missed the start of the 2009–2010 season for Millwall. He came back from injury with a goal against Stockport County.

On 28 January 2010, Robinson extended his contract with Millwall until 2013. He scored the only goal of the 2010 Football League One play-off final against Swindon Town in the 39th minute on 29 May 2010 to guide Millwall to the Football League Championship, also receiving the man of the match award.

After appearing regularly for Millwall in the following campaigns, Robinson signed a new three-year deal on 17 July 2012. However, he appeared in only three matches during the 2012–13 season, due to multiple injuries.

Portsmouth
On 6 August 2014 Robinson joined Portsmouth in a one-month loan deal. He scored his first goal against Mansfield in a 1–1 home draw. His loan ended when his contract was cancelled by parent club Millwall on 6 January 2015. The next day, Robinson signed an 18-month contract with Portsmouth. His first and second goals for Pompey came against Mansfield and Cambridge United.

Robinson was appointed Portsmouth captain for the forthcoming 2015/16 season, but departed the club on 31 July 2015 by mutual consent.

AFC Wimbledon
On 3 August 2015, Robinson joined AFC Wimbledon on a one-year deal after a trial. Robinson scored his first goal for the club in a 4–1 win at Cambridge United on 2 January 2016.

He was released by AFC Wimbledon at the end of the 2017–18 season.

Havant & Waterlooville 
On the 14th of June 2018 Robinson joined semi-professional club Havant & Waterlooville F.C. in their maiden season in the National League.

Coaching career

Portsmouth 
On the 28th of June 2018 Robinson rejoined Portsmouth F.C. as a defensive coach, linking up with former Millwall manager Kenny Jackett.

Career statistics

Honours
Millwall
Football League One play-offs: 2010

AFC Wimbledon
Football League Two play-offs: 2016

Individual
AFC Wimbledon Player of the Year: 2015–16

References

External links

1982 births
Living people
Footballers from Chipping Barnet
English footballers
Association football defenders
Millwall F.C. players
Fisher Athletic F.C. players
Torquay United F.C. players
Portsmouth F.C. players
AFC Wimbledon players
English Football League players
Portsmouth F.C. non-playing staff
Association football coaches